Antipolo Lady of Lourdes School, or ALLS, is a private, non-sectarian school located at the Interior National Road, Brgy. San Jose, Antipolo, Rizal, Philippines. It caters to pre-school, elementary, junior high school, and senior high school students in Antipolo and nearby municipalities. The school offers an academic track, specifically the General Academic Strand, for upcoming Grade 11 students.

History
The school was founded by Anacleto Mauricio in 1992. It was begun as a school for pre-school and elementary students. After some time, it expanded to accommodate high school students.

School Head
The school is administered in the grade school department by Directress Aimee C. Mauricio, while the high school department is led by Principal Edna Durana.

Clubs and Organizations

ALLSSO (Antipolo Lady of Lourdes School Student Organization) 
ALLSSO is a student organization in the secondary level. It is aimed at developing the leadership skills of a students who wish to consolidate their efforts towards promoting student based activities that will benefit the entire school community.

All high school students from Grade 7 onwards are automatic members. Students go through a democratic process of electing a set of school leaders that will spearhead projects for the interest and benefit of the student body.

An adviser shall be assigned to monitor the planning sessions and create implementing guidelines for the ALLSSO officers. The ALLSSO meets twice a month.

Art Club 
The Art Club is an organization aimed at developing students with skills in drawing, painting, sketching and designing. Members are given the chance to hone their talents by representing the school in off-campus competitions as well as help create back drops for school wide programs. Members of the Art Club will also be exposed to using computer graphics through soft wares that will enhance their creativity and imagination.

ALLS Varsity Team 
The ALLS Varsity Team comprises the basketball, volleyball, table tennis, badminton, chess. Interested members would need to undergo training and pass the try-outs given by the different coaches. Students who wish to join must have strong endurance, are physically fit and healthy and must obtain written permission from their parents. The team represent the school in inter-school sports competition.

ALLS Choir 
The ALLS Choir serves as an organization for students who love to sing to get together and learn. It gives musically inclined children to engage in school activities like programs and masses. It enables members to exercise their passion for singing and share their talents during school shows and special presentations.

ALLS Dance Club 
The ALLS Dance Club is an organization that caters to students who like to dance and perform. Students must audition for this group. This group will be tapped for special in-campus and off-campus shows. Members get together twice a month to practice and plan.

Schools in Antipolo
Educational institutions established in 1992
1992 establishments in the Philippines